The Walk TV (stylized as the WALK TV) is an American Christian specialty television network in the United States.

The network consists primarily of 263 low-powered television stations across the United States, and is also available on C-band free-to-air satellite services. In addition, The Walk TV is also available to users of the Roku Digital media receiver.

History
The network was launched as LegacyTV on January 11, 2010.
The purpose of this channel is to provide programming that helps people appreciate the Judeo-Christian legacy. The name of the channel was changed to its current name in 2013. The network was run by James L. West, who also ran the Doctor TV channel.

In February 2020, WGGS-TV acquired The Walk TV.

Programming

General programming
The Walk TV programming lineup consists primarily of religious programming, family movies, off-network syndicated public domain episodes of Bonanza, and some Christian music programming. The Walk TV also features a program produced and hosted by Randall Terry, "Voice of Resistance" in addition to religious news programs from CBN such as The 700 Club and CBN Newswatch.

Children’s educational programming

Adventures in Odyssey
Donkey Ollie
Dr. Wonders Worship
iShine Kinect
Laura McKenzie’s Traveler
Miss Charity’s Diner
Real Life 101
The Real Winning Edge
Scaly Adventures
So You Want To Be
Sugar Creek Gang

Sports programming
The Walk TV, along with the JUCE TV and Tri-State Christian Television networks, provide broadcasts of college football games involving the Lynchburg, Virginia-based Liberty University Flames, a member of the Big South Conference. The game broadcasts are produced by the university-operated Liberty Flames Sports Network. Unlike JUCE TV, The Walk TV shows those games live. Game On is a sports-related show that is offered by The Walk TV. This is only available to full-time Walk TV affiliates.

Affiliates
The following is a list of confirmed Walk TV affiliates

References

External links

The Walk TV Official Website
The Walk TV on Facebook
RabbitEars.Info - The Walk TV query

Television channels and stations established in 2010
2010 establishments in South Carolina
2020 mergers and acquisitions
Television networks in the United States
Religious television stations in the United States
Christian television networks
English-language television stations in the United States